Kamalabad (also Romanized as Kamālābād) is a village in Nosratabad Rural District, in the Central District of Alborz County, Qazvin Province, Iran. At the 2006 census, its population was 2,358, in 564 families.

References 

Populated places in Alborz County